Akershus County Municipality was the regional governing administration of the old Akershus county in Norway. The county municipality was established in its most recent form on 1 January 1976 when the law was changed to allow elected county councils in Norway. The county municipality was dissolved on 1 January 2020, when Akershus was merged with the neighboring counties of Buskerud and Østfold, creating the new Viken county which is led by the Viken County Municipality. The administrative seat is located in Oslo (which was not part of Akershus) and the county mayor was Anette Solli.

The main responsibilities of the county municipality included the running of the 35 upper secondary schools. It managed all the county roadways, public transport, dental care, culture, and cultural heritage sites in the county.

Transport
Public transport in Akershus is managed by Ruter, a transit authority owned along with the City of Oslo. It markets all public transport except the Oslo Commuter Rail in Akershus, though operations are provided by private companies based on public service obligation.

County government
The Oppland county council was made up of 43 representatives that were elected every four years. The council essentially acted as a Parliament or legislative body for the county and it met several times each year. The council was divided into standing committees and an executive board which met considerably more often. Both the council and executive board were led by the county mayor who held the executive powers of the county.

County mayors
1 Jan 1963–31 Dec 1968: Thor Gystad (Labour Party)
1 Jan 1969-31 Dec 1975: Kjell Knudsen (Labour Party)
1 Jan 1976-31 Dec 1979: Thorleif Løken (Conservative Party)
1 Jan 1980-31 Dec 1987: Tore Haugen (Conservative Party)
1 Jan 1988-31 Dec 1991: Øyvind Ruud (Christian Democratic Party)
1 Jan 1992–31 Dec 2003: Ragnar Kristoffersen (Labour Party)
1 Jan 2003–31 Dec 2007: Hildur Horn Øien (Christian Democratic Party)
1 Jan 2007–31 Dec 2013: Nils Aage Jegstad (Conservative Party)
1 Jan 2014-31 Dec 2019: Anette Solli (Conservative Party)

County council
The party breakdown of the council is as follows:

References

 
County municipality
County municipalities of Norway
1838 establishments in Norway
2020 disestablishments in Norway